Caddington Hall was a country estate in Markyate, Bedfordshire, England. The house was demolished in 1975.

In 1804, a family by the name of Pedley traded their farm for the estate, where a small house had stood. They tore it down and built Caddington Hall.

References

Country houses in Bedfordshire
Demolished buildings and structures in England
1975 disestablishments in England
British country houses destroyed in the 20th century
Buildings and structures demolished in 1975
Markyate